Mokrzycki (feminine Mokrzycka) is a Polish surname. Notable people with the surname include:

 Maria Mokrzycka (1882–1971), Polish opera singer
 Michał Mokrzycki (born 1997), Polish footballer
 Mieczysław Mokrzycki (born 1961), Polish archbishop

Polish-language surnames